Chris Attoh (born Christopher Keith Nii Attoh; May 17, 1979) is a Ghanaian actor, film director, on-air personality, television presenter and producer. He is best known as "Kwame Mensah" in Nigerian soap opera Tinsel.

Education 
He attended the New York Film Academy, Achimota School and Accra Academy. At Accra Academy, his classmates included the media businessman and radio personality Nathan Adisi. He then moved on to KNUST where he studied for a Bachelor of Art in Painting degree. He later went to London to study Banking and Securities.

Hosting of events 
He co-hosted the 2016 edition of the Vodafone Ghana Music Awards with Naa Ashorkor and DJ Black. He was also the MC of the 2014 edition of F.A.C.E List Awards in New York City along with Sandra Appiah.

Personal life 
He was previously married to Damilola Adegbite, but was reported to be divorced in September 2017. He remarried on Saturday 6 October 2018 to Bettie Jennifer, a US-based businesswoman at a private ceremony in Accra.

Filmography

Films 
 Sylvia (2020)
 The Perfect Picture
 The Perfect Picture – Ten Years Later (2020)
 In Line (2018)
 An Accidental Zombie (Named Ted) (2018)
 A Trip to Jamaica (2016)
 "Happiness is a Four Letter Word" (2016)
 Flower Girl (2013)
 Journey to Self (2012)
 Single and Married (2012)
 Bad Luck Joe
 Scorned
 Life and Living It
 Esohe
 A Soldiers Story 2; Return from the Dead
 Love and Cancer
 Love and War
 Moving On
 Closure
 International Affairs
 Lotana
 The Rangers; Shadows Rising
 Sinking Sands
 One More Day
 The In-laws
 Potato Potatho
 Kintampo
 All About Love
 Choices
 Somniphobia
 Lovers Discretion
 James Town
 Six hours To Christmas
 Love and War
 Swings

Television 
 A House Divided (U.M.C) 2019–2020
 Fifty – the series 2020
 BRAT TV 2020
 Tinsel (2008–2013)
 Shuga (season 3) (2013–2015)

References

External links 
 
 Ameyaw Debrah, "Chris Attoh’s Son Celebrates First Birthday", YEN.
 Laila's Blog, "Damilola Adegbite removes husband’s name, unfollows him, and deletes all his photos from IG", Laila's Blog.

Alumni of the Accra Academy
Ghanaian male film actors
Ghanaian male television actors
Ghanaian film producers
1979 births
Living people
Place of birth missing (living people)
21st-century Ghanaian male actors
Ghanaian film directors
Ghanaian television personalities
Ghanaian film actors